Johann Sebastian Bach composed the church cantata  (There is nothing sound in my body), 25 in Leipzig for the 14th Sunday after Trinity and first performed it on 29 August 1723.

History and words 

The prescribed readings for the Sunday were from the Epistle to the Galatians, Paul's teaching on "works of the flesh" and "fruit of the Spirit", and from the Gospel of Luke, Cleansing ten lepers. The poet relates to the Gospel and compares the situation of man in general to that of the lepers. The sickness is first expressed in words from Psalm 38, . As Julian Mincham observes, "sin, decay, God's fury and the rotting of bones permeate much Lutheran theology in general and this opening chorus in particular". At the end of the third movement, Jesus is asked to heal. The last aria expressed the hope to sing thanks for it in the choir of the angels. The cantata is closed by the 12th and final stanza of Johann Heermann's hymn "" (1630).

Bach first performed the cantata on 29 August 1723.

Scoring and structure 

The cantata in six movements is scored for three vocal soloists (soprano, tenor and bass), a four-part choir, and a colourful Baroque instrumental ensemble of cornetto, three trombones, three recorders, two oboes, two violins, viola, and basso continuo.

Music 

The melody is known as "". But probably Bach had in mind the words of "" which he used later in his chorale cantata , a paraphrase of Psalm 6 which begins in stanza 2 "" (Heal me, dear Lord, because I am sick and weak). In a complex structure, Bach combines an instrumental introduction with the chorale tune in long notes in the continuo with figuration of strings and oboes, a choral double fugue, and the presentation of the choral by a choir of trombones with the cornetto as the soprano instrument, reinforced by three recorders which play an octave higher. John Eliot Gardiner regards the unusual use of the trombones, playing the chorale tune independent of the voices, as an "anticipation of the finale to Beethoven's Fifth Symphony".

The following three movements are all only accompanied by the continuo. A new perspective is opened in movement 5 in dance music for a concerto of strings and oboes, echoed by the recorders. The music relates to the text "" (in the exalted choir I shall sing with the angels). The closing chorale is set for four parts.

Recordings 

 J. S. Bach: Das Kantatenwerk – Sacred Cantatas Vol. 2, Nikolaus Harnoncourt, Wiener Sängerknaben, Chorus Viennensis, Concentus Musicus Wien, soloists of the Wiener Sängerknaben, Kurt Equiluz, Max van Egmond, Teldec 1972
 Die Bach Kantate Vol. 48, Helmuth Rilling, Gächinger Kantorei, Bach-Collegium Stuttgart, Arleen Augér, Adalbert Kraus, Philippe Huttenlocher, Hänssler 1978
 J. S. Bach: Complete Cantatas Vol. 7, Ton Koopman, Amsterdam Baroque Orchestra & Choir, Lisa Larsson, Gerd Türk, Klaus Mertens, Antoine Marchand 1997
 J. S. Bach: Cantatas Vol. 13 – Cantatas from Leipzig 1723, Masaaki Suzuki, Bach Collegium Japan, Yukari Nonoshita, Gerd Türk, Peter Kooy, BIS 1999
 Bach Edition Vol. 19 – Cantatas Vol. 10, Pieter Jan Leusink, Holland Boys Choir, Netherlands Bach Collegium, Marjon Strijk, Knut Schoch, Bas Ramselaar, Brilliant Classics 2000
 Bach Cantatas Vol. 7: Ambronay / Bremen / For the 14th Sunday after Trinity / For the Feast of St Michael and All Angels, John Eliot Gardiner, Monteverdi Choir, English Baroque Soloists, Malin Hartelius, James Gilchrist, Peter Harvey, Soli Deo Gloria 2000
 Ach süßer Trost!, Philippe Herreweghe, Collegium Vocale Gent, 2012

References

External links 
 
 Es ist nichts Gesundes an meinem Leibe BWV 25; BC A 129 / Sacred cantata (14th Sunday after Trinity) Bach Digital
 Cantata BWV 25 Es ist nichts Gesundes an meinem Leibe history, scoring, sources for text and music, translations to various languages, discography, discussion, Bach Cantatas Website
 BWV 25.6 bach-chorales.com

Church cantatas by Johann Sebastian Bach
Psalm-related compositions by Johann Sebastian Bach
1723 compositions